John A. Crowley (January 12, 1862 – September 23, 1896) was a 19th-century Major League Baseball player.

A native of Lawrence, Massachusetts, Crowley was one of 13 catchers used by Philadelphia Quakers pilot Harry Wright during the  season. Crowley responded by leading the catching staff with 48 games, while hitting .244 (41-for-168) with 26 runs scored and 19 runs batted in, including seven doubles and three triples without home runs.

Crowley died at the age of 34 in his hometown of Lawrence, Massachusetts.

Fact
Eventually, 19-year-old Jack Clements became the regular catcher for Philadelphia, maintaining his job for the next 13 seasons.

External links
Baseball Reference
Retrosheet

Philadelphia Quakers players
19th-century baseball players
Major League Baseball catchers
Baseball players from Massachusetts
1862 births
1896 deaths
Washington Nationals (minor league) players
Norfolk (minor league baseball) players
Meriden Maroons players
Lawrence (minor league baseball) players
LaCrosse Freezers players
Portland (minor league baseball) players